Barber v. Thomas, 560 U.S. 474 (2010), is a United States Supreme Court case in which the Court held, 6–3, that prisoners incarcerated in federal prisons are entitled to up to 54 days of "good time credits" for every year they are incarcerated, allowing federal inmates to reduce their sentence by up to 54 days per year of imprisonment for exhibiting good behavior. The case concerned how the United States Federal Bureau of Prisons should calculate "good time credits": whether they should be calculated based on the length of the sentence levied by the judge, or by the time actually served by the inmate.

Background
The petitioner, Michael Barber, sought habeas corpus in a federal district court. He argued that the Bureau of Prisons "inaccurately calculated his good time credit toward the service of his federal sentence." Barber argued that the BOP should have calculated good time credit based on the sentence imposed rather than the time actually served in prison. Barber's petition was denied by the district court, on appeal the Ninth Circuit affirmed the ruling of the lower courts citing Tablada v. Daniels noting that the good time credit statute was ambiguous and the BOP's interpretation was reasonable.

Opinion of the Court 
The court affirmed the lower court's ruling with a 6–3 vote.  Barber's attorneys argued that by allowing up to 54 days' credit for each year "of the prisoner's term of imprisonment," Congress intended federal sentences to be reduced by as much as 54 days for each year of the sentence imposed by the judge.  The government argued that the reduction applied at the end of each year that is actually served.  Under that interpretation, which prevailed, since the sentence keeps being reduced year after year, less credit in total is awarded. The difference is about one week per year for every federal prisoner serving a term of more than a year's duration. Justice Stephen Breyer wrote the majority opinion, while Justice Kennedy wrote the dissent.

See also 
 List of United States Supreme Court cases, volume 560

References

External links
 
 Transcript of Oral Arguments
 SCOTUS Wiki page

United States Supreme Court cases
United States Supreme Court cases of the Roberts Court
2010 in United States case law
United States sentencing case law